To Be True is an album released by Harold Melvin & the Blue Notes on the Philadelphia International record label in February 1975. It was produced by Kenneth Gamble & Leon Huff.

The album features the hit singles "Bad Luck", "Hope That We Can Be Together Soon" with Sharon Paige, and "Where Are All My Friends".

The album was remastered and reissued with bonus tracks in 2016 by Big Break Records.

Track listing

Personnel
Harold Melvin, Teddy Pendergrass, Bernard Wilson, Lawrence Brown, Jerry Cummings – vocals
Sharon Paige – female vocalist on "Hope That We Can Be Together Soon"
MFSB – music
Carla Benson, Evette Benton, Barbara Ingram - background vocals

Charts

Singles

Samples
Cyndi Lauper used an interpolation of "Where Are All My Friends" in the 2008 song "Set Your Heart" from her album Bring Ya to the Brink.

See also
List of number-one R&B albums of 1975 (U.S.)

References

External links
 

1975 albums
Harold Melvin & the Blue Notes albums
Albums produced by Leon Huff
Albums produced by Kenneth Gamble
Albums arranged by Bobby Martin
Albums recorded at Sigma Sound Studios
Philadelphia International Records albums